The Sardinian tree frog or Tyrrhenian tree frog (Hyla sarda) is a species of frog in the family Hylidae,  found in Corsica, Sardinia, and the Tuscan Archipelago.

Its natural habitats are temperate forests, temperate shrubland, rivers, intermittent rivers, freshwater marshes, intermittent freshwater marshes, and urban areas.

References 

Hyla
Amphibians of Europe
Fauna of Sardinia
Fauna of Corsica
Amphibians described in 1853
Taxonomy articles created by Polbot